Yesenia is a 1971 Mexican film directed by Alfredo B. Crevenna, based on an original story by Yolanda Vargas Dulché. The film stars Jacqueline Andere as the titular character, along with Jorge Lavat. Yesenia was a blockbuster in the Soviet Union, where it sold 91.4million tickets, and became the highest-grossing foreign film in the Soviet Union. Due to this success abroad, it ranks among the world's non-English language films with the highest attendance record.

Plot 
Yesenia (Jacqueline Andere) had grown up among gypsies but her mother was white. Obliged by the circumstances (and her parents), she felt the need to give her child to an old gypsy woman whom Yesenia believed to be her grandmother. The love of a soldier, disappointment, and other misunderstandings reveal the hidden truth.

Cast 
 Jacqueline Andere as Yesenia
 Jorge Lavat as Osvaldo
 Irma Lozano as Luisa
 Isabela Corona as Abuela

See also 
Yesenia (1970 TV series)
Yesenia (1987 TV series)
List of highest-grossing non-English films
List of highest-grossing films in the Soviet Union

References

External links 
 

1971 drama films
Mexican drama films
Films based on Mexican comics
Live-action films based on comics
Films about Romani people
1970s Spanish-language films
1970s Mexican films